Career Mode is a video game term referring to the mode of gameplay that involves taking control of a single character and guiding the character through a structured career. The mode is normally associated with sports games, where it is referred to by various names such as "Be a Pro mode", "superstar mode", "My Player mode",  and "Road to the Show mode", in which a player controls the career of a single athlete.

Normal features of the mode include tracking the character's statistics and customizing the character's appearance and attributes. Additional options may also be available, such as participating in various activities outside of the main gameplay, as in NBA 2K13 which allows players to spend virtual currency to make special appearances at charity functions to improve team chemistry.

Compared to other modes of typical sports or racing video games, the pacing in the early moments of career mode tends to be conservative and in favor of experience point/grinding.

Features

Players in the mode are normally rated, sometimes with a scale from 0 to 99 (with 99 being the highest score) in both the overall category and in various categories that correspond to a specific position (e.g., a quarterback in American football, a catcher in baseball, a point guard in basketball).

Career mode generally rewards players for positive plays (such as scoring a basket, grabbing a rebound, hitting a home run, blocking a shot, or scoring a touchdown) and penalizes them for negative plays (like missed shots, throwing an interception, or striking out). During matches, gamers take the role of one specific player, controlling all of their actions with  teammates controlled by the game's A.I. Normally a limited amount of control is provided over teammates such as calling for a teammate to pass or take a shot. Players can always benefit from the A.I. when they either take a shot that is appropriate for their skill level or pass to the receiver that they happen to see open.

Some games such as the Madden NFL series award experience points that can be used to augment ratings of various skills. Games such as MLB 13: The Show, feature in-depth creation features allowing for control over many aspects of the in-game character. In addition to playing skills, other vital statistics such as eye color, weight, height, and date of birth may also be editable. Career mode may also span in-game years, taking a player from rookie year to retirement.

While video games with career mode have been exclusively single-player in the past, Madden NFL 13 brings a true multiplayer career mode experience by allowing multiple players to play their career modes with each other at the same time. The only limitation is that players cannot be on a team that is controlled by a human-controlled coach. Recent games like NBA 2K13 and Madden NFL 13 have a fake social networking screen that operates similar to Twitter.

Association football games like FIFA 13 handle red-card suspensions for the player's career mode persona just like if it was a computer-controlled player in the manager mode. Career mode is also featured in the EA Sports NASCAR game

Career modes                            
Madden: Superstar Mode Madden NFL 06-Madden NFL 12  Longshot: Madden NFL 18 - Madden NFL 19   QB1 Face of the franchise: Madden NFL 20 - Present

NBA 2K:  24/7 ESPN NBA Basketball - ESPN NBA 2K5     24/7 Road to the EBC NBA 2K6          24/7:Next NBA 2K7      MyPlayer  NBA 2K10 - NBA 2K12    MyCareer NBA 2K13 - Present

NHL:  Be a pro : NHL 09- NHL 13 /NHL 15 -Present Live The life: NHL 14   

MLB The Show: MLB 08 The Show-Present

FIFA: Career FIFA 08 - Present   The Journey: FIFA 17 - FIFA 19

NBA Live: The One NBA Live 18 - NBA Live 19

References

Video game gameplay
Video game terminology
Multiplayer and single-player video games